"Absolution" is a short story by American writer F. Scott Fitzgerald. It was included in his 1926 collection All the Sad Young Men.

Publication
"Absolution" was originally published in The American Mercury in June 1924. The story would later be published in Fitzgerald's third short story collection All the Sad Young Men in 1926.

Background

Fitzgerald began writing "Absolution" in June 1923. In a letter to Maxwell Perkins, Fitzgerald stated that it was originally intended to be the prologue of his later novel The Great Gatsby, but that it "interrupted with the neatness of the plan". In 1934, Fitzgerald wrote in a letter to a fan that the story was intended to show Gatsby's early life, but was cut to preserve his "sense of mystery".

Plot overview 
"Absolution", narrated in the third person, focuses on a young boy named Rudolph Miller, who often fantasizes about a self-created alter ego called Blatchford Sarnemington. Rudolph, an 11-year-old Catholic, attends a confession with Father Schwartz. Rudolph describes what he believes is a terrible sin he committed. In a flashback, Rudolph lies to Father Schwartz in a previous confession. Rudolph also gets in trouble with his father when he attempts to avoid communion by drinking water before. After telling Father Schwartz about these two instances, Father Schwartz collapses and a startled Rudolph flees.

Critical reception 
Upon publication in All the Sad Young Men, the story was met with mixed reception. The New York Times wrote that "Absolution" is "simple and stripped of artifice". In the Saturday Review of Literature, the story is described as "first rate. Three quarters of it, at least, is masterly. Then the author falters". In the Literary Review of the New York Evening Post, the story is praised along with the other stories in All the Sad Young Men. Contemporary reviewers often focus on the story's connection with The Great Gatsby. However, some scholars argue against that this connection has been overemphasized. 
Some modern scholars have also drawn parallels between "Absolution" and James Joyce's short story "The Sisters".

References

External links
 Absolution at Project Gutenberg Australia

1924 short stories
Short stories by F. Scott Fitzgerald
Third-person narrative fiction